Wigston Glen Parva railway station was a railway station on the Birmingham to Peterborough Line that served Glen Parva in Leicestershire, England.

History
The station was opened in 1882 for military use, and on 1 April 1884 for public use. 

In 1950 the station won first prize in the London Midland Region Garden Competition.

British Rail closed the station in 1968.

Stationmasters

Thomas Holmes 1884 - 1886
William Henry Abbey 1886 - 1888
Robert John Cross 1888
Robert Hamp 1888 - 1896
William Chadwick 1892 - 1896
Walter Vernon Scott 1896 - 1900
Frederick John Sharpe  1900 - 1907
Horace Steers 1907 - ca. 1918
Samuel Tweager ca. 1925
J.J. Davies until 1929 (also station master at Wigston Glen Parva, afterwards station master at Morecambe Promenade)
T. Bond until 1940 (also stationmaster at Glen Parva and Wigston Magna, afterwards station master at Barking)
P. Wakefield ca. 1948
F.S. Willsmer ca. 1950

Route

References

Disused railway stations in Leicestershire
Former London and North Western Railway stations
Beeching closures in England
Railway stations in Great Britain opened in 1884
Railway stations in Great Britain closed in 1968